The 1924–25 Torquay United F.C. season was Torquay United's fourth season in competitive football and their third season in the Southern League.  The season runs from 1 July 1924 to 30 June 1925.

Overview
Following on from their first two years in the Southern League, which had resulted in encouraging 6th and 4th place finishes, Torquay United's third season would prove to be something of a disappointment by comparison.  With new player-manager Harry Raymond replacing Crad Evans, financial problems which threatened the continued existence of the club meant that Raymond's team was not as strong as that which had been made available to Evans. The financial crisis eventually resulted in the departure of Raymond in December to be replaced by F.G.B. Mortimer who had previously played for the club during the 1921–22 season.  Although the Magpies managed to get the season off to a reasonable start, they were to suffer their biggest defeat to date in November with a humiliating 7–0 loss to Plymouth Argyle Reserves at Home Park.  Unfortunately, the Pilgrim Reserves heaped even more misery on Torquay when they visited Plainmoor in January and returned to Plymouth with an 8-1 victory.  The Magpies also had a fairly disappointing FA Cup run, being knocked out in a First Qualifying Round replay by Taunton United.

Despite another good campaign from their prolific forward Billy Kellock, Torquay had a poor end to their third Southern League season and could only manage a lowly 15th-place finish in the Western Section table.

Competitions

Southern League Western Section

Standings

Matches

FA Cup

Devon Professional Cup

References

External links

Torquay United
Torquay United F.C. seasons